Yasnaya Polyana is a rural locality (a village) in Kiprevskoye Rural Settlement, Kirzhachsky District, Vladimir Oblast, Russia. The population was 3 as of 2010. There is 1 street.

Geography 
Yasnaya Polyana is located on the Shorna River, 26 km northeast of Kirzhach (the district's administrative centre) by road. Skomorokhovo is the nearest rural locality.

References 

Rural localities in Kirzhachsky District